Fish to Tsitsikama WMA, or Fish to Tsitsikama Water Management Area (coded: 15), in South Africa Includes the following major rivers: the Fish River, Kowie River, Boesmans River, Sundays River, Gamtoos River, Kromme River, Tsitsikamma River and Groot River, and covers the following Dams:

 Beervlei Dam Groot River 
 Darlington Dam Sondags River 
 De Mistkraal Dam Little Fish River 
 Grassridge Dam Groot Brak River 
 Groendal Dam Swartkops River 
 Impofu Dam Krom River 
 Katrivier Dam Kat River 
 Kommandodrift Dam Tarka River 
 Kouga Dam Kouga River 
 Kromrivier Dam Krom River 
 Loerie Dam Loerie Spruit 
 Nqweba Dam Sondags River

Boundaries 
Primary drainage regions L, M, N, P, Q and tertiary drainage regions K80 and K90.

See also 
 Water Management Areas
 List of reservoirs and dams in South Africa
 List of rivers of South Africa

References 

Water Management Areas